The Britain Israel Communications and Research Centre (BICOM) is a UK-based organisation which acts to promote awareness of Israel and the Middle East in the United Kingdom. BICOM publishes materials such as briefings and a journal, Fathom, covering the history, economy, culture and politics of Israel, Middle East peace plans, terrorism in the Middle East, UK-Israel relations and foreign policy.

History
BICOM was founded in 2002 by Poju Zabludowicz following the Second Intifada. It is funded through private donations.

In 2005, Ruth Smeeth joined as director of public affairs and campaigns.

In 2009, it was described as "one of the most persistent and slickest media operations in the battle for influence over opinion formers".

We Believe in Israel
We Believe in Israel is BICOM's pro-Israel advocacy organization in the United Kingdom. The current director is former Labour councillor Luke Akehurst. We Believe in Israel provides learning materials to both the Board of Deputies of British Jews and the United Synagogue.

It is a member of the Jewish Leadership Council.

According to their website, We Believe in Israel was launched following the We Believe in Israel Conference in London in May 2011, supported by 26 community organisations and attended by 1500 delegates.

In the 2010s, the group asked The Co-operative Group to reverse its decision to boycott certain Israeli products.

Fathom journal
Fathom was founded in 2012 by political theorist Alan Johnson as a quarterly online scholarly journal  under the motto: Fathom: for a deeper understanding of Israel and the region.

Martin Sherman of the Israel Institute for Strategic Studies accused Fathom in 2016 of "stifling debate" by refusing to publish articles by writers who oppose the two-state solution.

See also
 Israel lobby in the United Kingdom

References

External links
 Official Website
 Fathom Journal
 We Believe in Israel

Political organisations based in the United Kingdom
Media analysis organizations and websites
Non-governmental organizations involved in the Israeli–Palestinian conflict
2002 establishments in the United Kingdom
Organizations established in 2002
Zionism in the United Kingdom
Zionist organizations
Lobbying in the United Kingdom